Stian Aarstad is a Norwegian pianist and keyboard player best known for his four-year (1993–1997) stint with the black metal band Dimmu Borgir during which he played keyboards and synthesizers while engendering criticism and controversy for appearing onstage and performing in a top-hat-and-cape outfit reminiscent of Jack the Ripper, while wearing minimal corpse makeup and not moving or showing any emotion. Upon joining Dimmu Borgir, he didn't listen to metal music, preferring only to listen to classical.

Dimmu Borgir's second album Stormblåst (1996) was laced with plagiarism, Stian Aarstad stole from the Magnum track "Sacred Hour"  in the opening song "Alt lys er svunnet hen" ("All Light Has Faded Away") and he copied the title track of the Amiga game "Agony"  for the song "Sorgens kammer" ("Chamber of Sorrow"). Aarstad contributed little if any originality to this album, the band re-recorded the album in 2005 leaving these plagiarized tracks out.

In 1998 to 1999, he produced a demo for the unblack metal band Vaakevandring, which was later re-released as a self-titled EP in 2004. In the 2000s, Aarstad had been the pianist for the band Enthral, but left his regular position during the recording of the band's third album.

As of 2005, Aarstad has been performing with the electronica/pop music act Karatkorn.

References

1970s births
Living people
Dimmu Borgir members
Norwegian black metal musicians
Heavy metal keyboardists
Norwegian rock keyboardists
Norwegian rock pianists
Norwegian male pianists
People from Jessheim
Old Man's Child members
Heavy metal producers